Barry Allen, also known by his alter ego The Flash, is a fictional character in The CW's Arrowverse franchise, first introduced in the 2013 episode "The Scientist" of the television series Arrow, and later starring in The Flash. The character is based on the DC Comics character of the same name, created by Robert Kanigher and Carmine Infantino and was adapted for television in 2013 by Greg Berlanti, Andrew Kreisberg and Geoff Johns. Barry Allen has been continually portrayed by Grant Gustin, with Logan Williams and Liam Hughes portraying younger versions.

In the series, Barry is 26 and portrayed as a smart, goofy and tardy character, who works at the Central City Police Department as a forensic chemist. When he was younger, he witnessed the murder of his mother by the Reverse Flash, which resulted in the false imprisonment of his father for the crime. Later in life, while working at the Central City Police Department he is struck by lightning created by the explosion of the S.T.A.R. Labs particle accelerator sending him to a nine-month coma. After waking up he finds himself in S.T.A.R. Labs and develops metahuman powers; the power of speed and he becomes friends with Cisco Ramon and Caitlin Snow. Throughout the series, he is constantly training to lead to him becoming the Fastest speedster across the multiverse. Barry uses his powers, along with his team's help, to fight criminals and other metahumans who have misused their powers. He is a friend and frequent ally of Star City-based vigilante archer Green Arrow and Kryptonian superheroine Supergirl. The three together are known as “The Trinity”.

Gustin has appeared as Barry Allen and his superhero persona in crossovers on the television series Arrow, Legends of Tomorrow, Supergirl, and the animated web series Vixen, all set within the Arrowverse. The character has also appeared in a digital comic book series. Gustin has received critical acclaim for his performance and has won an IGN award.

Storylines

Arrow

Crime-scene investigator Barry Allen was introduced in the second season of Arrow, in which he arrives in Starling City to personally investigate a superhuman-related crime. He is a fan of the Arrow's exploits and learns Oliver Queen is the vigilante; they become friends. Sometime after Barry returns to Central City, he is struck in his laboratory by lightning which was affected by dark matter from the explosion of the S.T.A.R. Labs' particle accelerator.

The Flash

In The Flash, Barry awakens from a nine-month coma at S.T.A.R Labs and finds himself with superhuman speed. He uses his new powers to fight crime and hunt other metahumans in Central City as the Flash, a masked superhero, with the assistance of Cisco Ramon, Caitlin Snow and Harrison Wells, while he tries to identify his mother's murderer. When he was a child, his mother was murdered and his father, Henry Allen, was incorrectly sentenced for the crime. Barry was fostered by detective Joe West, the father of his friend and childhood crush Iris.

In season one, Barry discovers that "Wells" is Eobard Thawne / Reverse-Flash in disguise and that he killed Nora Allen after his plan to travel back in time to kill Barry as a child was foiled by the Flash of his timeline, unintentionally severing his own Speed Force connection and leaving him stranded in the present day. After capturing him with the assistance of his allies, Barry is given the opportunity to rescue his mother by helping Eobard return to his time. Although he initially decides to go through with Eobard's offer, Barry decides not to at the last minute, after he is warned by his older self not to interfere, and instead returns to the present and fights with Eobard, stopping him from returning to the future. Barry is almost killed, but Eddie Thawne sacrifices himself to destroy Eobard.

In season two, after a singularity event occurs, the Flash is recognized as Central City's hero. However, the event brings a new threat from a parallel earth in the form of the speedster Zoom, who seeks to eliminate all speedsters throughout the multiverse. Barry discovers a recording of Eobard's confession of Nora's murder that clears his father of all charges, with Barry inheriting Harrison Wells' fortune and resources from Eobard. Though rich, Barry chooses to continue working for the Central City Police Department while using Wells' money to fund his and his allies' activities. After Zoom kills Barry's father, Barry defeats Zoom and travels back in time to save his mother's life.

In season three, by changing his past, Barry alters the timeline, resulting in the alternate timeline "Flashpoint". Though he is somewhat able to restore the timeline, this creates new threats, including the emergence of Savitar, a god-like speedster with a grudge against Barry. When Barry accidentally travels to the future and sees Iris killed by Savitar, he becomes desperate to change the future to prevent that from happening. He learns the identity of Savitar is a clone of a future version of himself. After saving Iris and defeating Savitar, Barry takes his place in the Speed Force in order to repent for his creation of Flashpoint.

In season four, after being stranded in the Speed Force for six months, Barry is freed by Team Flash. The team later encounters Clifford DeVoe / Thinker, an adversary with the fastest mind alive, who has orchestrated Barry's return from the Speed Force as well as the creation of the bus metas. However, DeVoe frames Barry for murder shortly afterwards; not wanting to risk compromising his loved ones and allies by revealing his secrets, Barry allows himself to be sentenced to life imprisonment. A month later, private detective Ralph Dibny, who joins the Flash's team, uses his new shapeshifting power to impersonate DeVoe and help clear Barry of all charges. Following the Thinker's defeat, the team is approached by Barry and Iris' daughter from the future, Nora West-Allen.

In season five, Nora arrives from the future, wanting to change the events that lead to Barry's disappearance in the future. However, Nora's presence has altered the timeline and unleashed Cicada, a serial killer bent on killing metahumans. Furthermore, the team eventually learn of her allegiance with Eobard, who orchestrated Nora's arrival and Cicada. Barry and Nora succeed in subduing Eobard, but are forced to let him go and Nora is erased from the timeline.

In season six, Barry and Iris learn that the date of the crisis in which Barry disappears has moved up from April 2024 to December 2019, and that in order to save billions, the Flash must die. Meanwhile, Ramsey Rosso has discovered a way to cure people through dark matter, only to turn himself into a metahuman with a violent bloodthirst. Following Rosso's defeat, Barry surviving the crisis, and the multiverse's destruction and rebirth, Team Flash try to navigate the world post-crisis all while the secret organization Black Hole and quantum engineer Eva McCulloch move forward with their mysterious plans. Barry later discovers that Oliver enhancing his speed during the crisis has damaged the Speed Force. As a result, the Speed Force dies and all speedsters will permanently lose their speed. Barry gets the idea to create an artificial Speed Force to save his speed.

The seventh season sees Barry continue to develop an artificial Speed Force and finish his fight with Eva before dealing with the emergence of several new Forces, the Strength, Still and Sage forces, that were born by Barry and Iris recreating the Speed Force. Trouble soon ensues when the manifestation of the new Speed Force goes mad and begins to threaten the city but Barry is able to tame it. Soon after, a new speedster calling himself Godspeed arrives from the future to threaten Barry but he is joined by his future children, Nora and Bart, to take the villain down.

In season eight, Barry deals with the psychic alien Despero and the reemergence of Thawne, a malevolent entity named Deathstorm, who feeds on people's grief and the rise of the Negative Forces and their avatars, including Thawne.

Crossovers

In the season one episode "Worlds Finest" of Supergirl, Barry accidentally enters the universe of Kara Danvers / Supergirl and Clark Kent / Superman after passing through an extradimensional breach while testing a tachyon accelerator. He teams up with Kara in order to take down Livewire and Silver Banshee, after which Kara assists him in returning to his universe.

In the crossover "Crisis on Earth-X", Barry and Iris' friends come to Central City for their wedding, only to be interrupted when villains from Earth-X disrupt the proceedings. After defeating the invaders from Earth-X, Barry and Iris are married by John Diggle.

In the crossover "Elseworlds", Arkham Asylum doctor John Deegan rewrites reality, which results in Barry and Oliver swapping lives. In the new reality, they are the only ones that know that they are in the wrong lives and have each other's powers, which results in them going to Gotham City with Kara Danvers / Supergirl to confront Deegan.

In the crossover "Crisis on Infinite Earths", the Monitor recruits Barry, Oliver, Kara, Kate Kane / Batwoman, Sara Lance / White Canary, Ray Palmer / Atom, and several others from throughout the multiverse to stop the Anti-Monitor from destroying reality. Barry's fate during the crisis is altered by the intervention of Earth-90's Flash, who sacrifices himself in Barry's place. Following Oliver's sacrifice and the Anti-Monitor's defeat, Barry leads a new group of heroes who agree to work together to protect their new world, dubbed Earth-Prime, in memory of Oliver.

Costume
Barry's suit is altered and upgraded every season. The suit is designed by Cisco Ramon and its original design was intended as a uniform for firefighters. The suit was a modernised version of the traditional flash suit with a matching dark maroon colored helmet, which features the same maroon emblem and gold lightning symbol as the suit does. The second season suit made minor changes to the suit, the alteration being the background color of the emblem is now white with a gold lightning symbol which is more true to the comics. Besides the alteration of the emblem in season 2, there appears to only minor changes made throughout the three seasons. The suit in season 4 appears to be a brighter red, with added leather paddings and golden accents. The fifth season made one of the most significant changes, that is the removal of the chin strap and switching the fabric softer more body fitting look, created by Ryan Choi, in the future. The sixth season suit is fairly similar to the season 5 suit though now with gold piping along the torso and an entirely new cowl which features the return of the chinstrap as well as modified ear pieces designed to look more like the classic Hermes wings from the comics.

Relationships

Iris West 
Barry and Iris's relationship has often been compared to Superman and Lois Lane, she is introduced as his one true love. Barry and Iris were close friends since they were 10 years old, this friendship escalates after Barry's mother is murdered and Barry was adopted by Iris's father Joe West, becoming her adoptive brother. It is revealed in the first season that Barry is in love with Iris while Iris still sees him as a brother. It is later shown that a newspaper article is written by Iris West-Allen in 2024, thus indicating their future romance and marriage. Iris and Barry's relationship changes due to alterations of the timeline when Barry time travels, however, their love seems to always prevail and they are eventually married, Barry says in his wedding vows "That's you. You’ve always been there, as a friend, as a partner, as the love of my life. You’re my home, Iris, and that's one thing that will never change.". The end of season four reveals that, in one timeline, Iris and Barry have 2 children named Nora and Bart in the future.

Linda Park 
Barry dates Linda Park briefly in the first season, who is both friends and colleagues at the Central City Picture News with Iris West. Their relationship slowly dies out as she suspects him to still be in love with Iris, they eventually break up and decide that they are better off as friends.

Patty Spivot 
Barry and Patty Spivot begin dating in the second season, she was much like Barry with her quirky personality and sad past, which has caused them to dedicate their lives and careers to avenging and seeking the truth about their parents. Patty made the decision to end the relationship because Barry was pushing her away emotionally, and she needed to attend Midway City University and study to become a CSI agent, which meant she had to leave Central City and consequently him. Before leaving she had one final case with Barry, in which she tells Barry "I know you’re upset but I was hoping it wouldn't be like this between us".

Other versions

Versions from other Earths
 Barry Allen of Earth-2 (also played by Gustin) is a non-metahuman who is a CSI at the Central City Police Department and a PhD graduate, married to Iris West but despised by Joe.
 Blitzkrieg of Earth-X, seen in Freedom Fighters: The Ray was originally confirmed by Marc Guggenheim in an interview to be that Earth's Barry Allen. However, many of the concepts for Earth-X have changed since the interview and the animated series' production started and as such, it is unclear whether this information is still accurate. He is voiced by Scott Whyte and is an amalgamation of Baron Blitzkrieg, Baroness Blitzkrieg, Blitzen and Nazi Flash.
 Barry Allen of Earth-90 is played by John Wesley Shipp.
 Ezra Miller’s Barry Allen from an undesignated Earth met Earth-1 Barry in the Speed Force during "Crisis on Infinite Earths".

Savitar
Gustin also portrays Savitar (voiced by Tobin Bell in his exosuit which is performed by stuntman Andre Tricoteux), an evil and scarred future version of his character who is season three's main antagonist. Savitar is essentially Barry with no loved ones and embracing his dark side. Savitar's origins are a predestination paradox; he is a temporal duplicate of the Flash's future self using time travel in order to defeat Savitar. Although Savitar is ultimately defeated, the time remnant is spared but shunned by the rest of his friends and family for being an aberration. As a result, he goes back in time to set in motion the events that led to his own creation, including the death of Iris. Savitar's presence is "chronologically" the multiverse's first metahuman with speed. Naming himself after the Hindu god of motion, he is worshipped by his own cult. Long-held myths referenced Savitar throughout the multiverse with even Jay believing these stories, and with Savitar regarded as a worse nemesis than the Reverse-Flash, Zoom and the Thinker. From his prison, Savitar manipulates Julian Albert into acquiring the Philosopher's Stone, through which Doctor Alchemy can re-empower metahumans from the Flashpoint timeline. After manipulating Kid Flash into freeing him from his prison, Savitar next convinces Killer Frost to be his personal enforcer. When Savitar reveals his true identity to Barry, it forces his younger self to confront his own dark impulses and temptations that plagued him. Savitar's plan of Iris' murder before Barry (which would lead to his own creation), however, is ruined with the sacrifice of Earth-19's H.R. Wells by impersonating Iris. To save himself, Savitar manipulates Vibe to fragment himself throughout all of time and then goad his original self to give in to dark impulses as Savitar himself. However, both efforts are foiled by Team Flash and Savitar is erased from existence after being shot by Iris. In season five, Savitar has a cameo appearance when Barry and Nora time travel to season three and observe his final battle.

In other media
 Fortnite Battle Royale features a cosmetic outfit of The Flash, using the Arrowverse version of Barry Allen.

Reception

Critical response
Regarding Gustin's debut as Barry Allen in Arrow and the potential for a series, IGN's Jesse Schedeen stated his concern: "Gustin doesn't come across as leading man material. His awkward bumbling intertwining with Felicity's was cute, but rarely did I get the impression that this character could or should be given his own spinoff series." Schedeen eventually warmed up to the character, however, once the "dorkiness and social awkwardness" were downplayed a bit and the emphasis was placed on "his keen scientific mind".

Grant Gustin as Barry Allen has received positive reviews by both fans and critics, with The Flash being the most watched show in The CW history. Since the premiere of The Flash, Gustin has been nominated for 20 awards for his role as Barry Allen and had won a total of 5 of them. In 2015, Gustin won the Teen Choice Award for "Breakout Star", in that same year he won the Saturn Award for "Breakthrough Performance" and was nominated for "Best Actor on Television". In the following year Gustin won the Teen Choice Awards for "Choice TV Actor: Sci-fi/Fantasy" and in 2017 and 2018 he took home the Teen Choice Awards for "Choice TV Actor: Action".

Gustin's Barry Allen has been said to be the better Flash, compared to Ezra Miller who starred in the Warner Bros. Justice League. According to Nick Mangione from Geek.com, "By the time Ezra Miller made his brief cameo appearance in Batman v. Superman, we had already seen the perfect Barry Allen". He goes on to say "More than heart, more than a perfect embodiment of the character from the comics, Grant Gustin is the one true Barry Allen because his show allows him to be. At least at this point, the same can't be said for Miller and the DCEU."

While the first season received a large number of positive reviews, the latter seasons received more mixed reviews. Erik Kain a senior contributor on Forbes indicated that "The first season of 'The Flash' on the CW remains one of my very favourite seasons of a superhero show. I maintain that it's among the best ever made, with great characters and one of the most intriguing villains on TV.". Kain, however, also states that the show has gone downhill and that "Miller's Barry Allen is better in almost every way than Gustin's, though that's largely because he's not weighed down by CW melodrama.".

Accolades
All awards and nominations are for Grant Gustin's performance as Barry Allen in The Flash:

References

American male characters in television
Central City Police Department officers
Crossover characters in television
DC Comics characters who can move at superhuman speeds
DC Comics characters with accelerated healing
DC Comics metahumans
DC Comics scientists
Fictional characters who can duplicate themselves
Fictional characters who can manipulate sound
Fictional characters who can manipulate time
Fictional characters who can turn intangible
Fictional characters who can turn invisible
Fictional characters with density control abilities
Fictional characters with electric or magnetic abilities
Fictional forensic scientists
Fictional private investigators
Fictional vigilantes
The Flash (2014 TV series) characters
Flash (comics) characters
Superheroes who are adopted
Television characters introduced in 2013
Time travelers